The Cheebacabra is a psychedelic funk fusion band on their own Mackrosoft Records label.

Band members 

Cheeba- Drums, organ, piano, Fender Rhodes, synthesizer
Danny Welsh- Flute, Sax
Mark Adams- Guitar
Farko Dosumov- Bass
Zanchie Whitehead- Bass
Nick Allison- Fender Rhodes
Joe Doria- Hammond B-3 organ
Alex Westcoat- Drums
Johnny Conga- Percussion
Anthony Warner- Synthesizers
Bob Lovelace- Bass
Jay Jaskot- Drums
Ryan Braun- Trumpet
Alex Veley- Clavinet, organ, Fender Rhodes
Steve Black- Guitar
Daniel Gould- Organ, saxophone, synthesizers
Snakerythms- Saxophone
Victor Tapia- Percussion
Aja West- Drum fill, synthesizer, electric bass, cymbals
Steve Moore- Synthesizer, piano
Dave Carter- Trumpet
Fred Roth- Electric bass
Money Mark- Keyboards
David Mullenova- Violin
Peter Scherr- Upright bass
Jason Vontver- Drums
Kenny Mandell- Sax, Flute
Mike Porcaro- Bass guitar

Discography

Albums 
 Metamorphosis (2003)
 Exile In The Woods (2006)
 Pass the Information (2012)
 Retouched (2015)

External links 

American funk musical groups